Nicholas Peter Franks FRS FRSB (born 14 October 1949) has been Professor of Biophysics and Anaesthetics at Imperial College London since 1993. His research focuses on how general anaesthetics act at the cell and molecular levels as well as with neuronal networks. Franks holds patents on use of xenon gas as a neuroprotectant  and has published research on the use of the anesthetic properties of xenon.

He was educated at Mill Hill School and King's College London (BSc 1972; PhD 1975). He was a lecturer in biophysics at Imperial College London from 1977 to 1989 and a reader in biophysics from 1989 to 1993.

Awards and honours 
Along with being made a Fellow of the Royal Society in 2011, Franks is also a Fellow of the Royal Society of Biology. He was a Distinguished  Lecturer in Neuroscience at the University of Toronto and Stuart Cullen Lecture, University of California San Francisco.

References

External links 
Neuroprotexeon Scientific Advisory Board
"Moderate hypothermia within 6 h of birth plus inhaled xenon versus moderate hypothermia alone after birth asphyxia (TOBY-Xe): a proof-of-concept, open-label, randomised controlled trial", The Lancet Neurology,  volume 15, issue 2, p 145-153, 1 February 2016
"Xenon Improves Neurologic Outcome and Reduces Secondary Injury Following Trauma in an In Vivo Model of Traumatic Brain Injury", Critical Care Medicine, January 2015, volume 43, issue 1, p 149-158, doi: 10.1097/CCM.0000000000000624

1949 births
Living people
People educated at Mill Hill School
Alumni of King's College London
Fellows of the Royal Society
Academics of Imperial College London
Fellows of the Royal Society of Biology